Dominique Urbany (29 March 1903 – 21 October 1986) was a Luxembourgian politician. He was the father of journalist and politician René Urbany.

Urbany was one delegates at the socialist congress at Differdange, that voted for affiliation to the Communist International. He was a founder of the Young Communist League of Luxembourg. He became general secretary of the Communist Party of Luxembourg in 1936. He was elected to parliament in 1945, leading the communist faction. He remained in parliament for three decades. In 1965 he became chairman of the Communist Party.

References

1903 births
1986 deaths
People from Rumelange
Luxembourgian politicians
Communist Party of Luxembourg politicians